Beartown Mountain is in the Clinch Mountain range, which is in eastern Russell County, Virginia, United States. At , it is the 7th highest summit in Virginia.  It is the 41st highest County High Point of the Eastern United States.

Beartown Mountain is in the  Clinch Mountain Wildlife Management Area. The ridgelines south and northeast of the summit are the approximate boundary for the Wildlife Management Area.

References

Summitpost.org
PBase.com

Mountains of Virginia
Blue Ridge Mountains
Landforms of Russell County, Virginia